Andreas Emil Hofmann (born 16 December 1991) is a German track and field athlete who competes in the javelin throw. His personal best of 92.06 m ranks him eighth on the overall list.

Career
As a junior, he won gold at the 2009 European Junior Championships. His first senior international competition was the 2014 European Championships. He finished sixth at the 2015 World Championships and eight at the 2017 World Championships. His best result as of 2017 is second place at the 2017 Summer Universiade, where he set his personal best of 91.07 m.

In July 2018, he won gold at the 2018 German Athletics Championships, setting a championship record of 89.55 m. In August, he won silver at the 2018 European Athletics Championships with a throw of 87.60 m.

At the 2019 World Athletics Championships, Hofmann, with a best throw at 80.06 m, did not progress from the qualifying round.

Competition record

Seasonal bests by year

2008 – 65.03 m
2009 – 77.84 m
2010 – 66.75 m
2011 – 73.98 m
2012 – 80.81 m
2013 – 75.56 m 
2014 – 86.13 m
2015 – 86.14 m
2016 – 85.42 m 
2017 – 91.07 m
2018 – 92.06 m
2019 – 89.65 m

Personal life
Hofmann studies sports science in Mannheim.

References

External links
 
 

1991 births
Living people
German male javelin throwers
World Athletics Championships athletes for Germany
Universiade medalists in athletics (track and field)
Sportspeople from Heidelberg
Universiade silver medalists for Germany
Diamond League winners
Medalists at the 2017 Summer Universiade
21st-century German people